Noosa Pirates Rugby League Football Club is an Australian rugby league football club based in Noosa formed in 1968. In 2017, the Pirates won their first division one title in the Sunshine Coast Rugby League since 2008.

Notable Juniors
Rocky Elsom (2003–12 NSW Waratahs & ACT Brumbies)
Jake Friend (2008–21 Sydney Roosters)
Moses Mbye (2014– Canterbury Bulldogs)

References

External links
 Official website

Sport in the Sunshine Coast, Queensland
Rugby league teams in Queensland
Rugby clubs established in 1968
1968 establishments in Australia
Shire of Noosa